HTMi, Hotel and Tourism Management Institute Switzerland is a private educational institute, that offers undergraduate and postgraduate academic degrees. The Institute provides hospitality management development courses and has its campus in Sörenberg, Switzerland. Each semester the Institute has approximately 200 students from more than 35 nationalities to engage its range of programmes, of which a similar number of additional students will be concurrently undertaking work placements, supported by the school, in Switzerland and internationally to consolidate their academic training. Currently, the Hotel and Tourism Management Institute is organised into six centres:
 The School of International Hotel and Tourism Management
 The Centre for Career Management
 The International Hospitality Research Centre Switzerland
 The Centre for Culinary Management
 The Centre for Events Management Training
The Student Service Centre

The school has two main buildings in Sörenberg which provide classrooms, training restaurants, accommodation and offices. These are Hotel Campus Mariental and Hotel Campus Panorama.

History
HTMi was established as a private hotel school in late 1990 in the UK where it began with a few students and moved from Scotland to Bournemouth. In 1999, it was unanimously decided that the School could not compete in the UK against the big Swiss hotel schools. In 1999, the management team planned a relocation strategy. Professor Robert Larmour launched HTMi in Sörenberg, Switzerland. HTMi started with 16 students from two nationalities; now it has approximately 420 students in Switzerland from 35 nationalities.

The Institute further enhanced its range of qualifications offered with the introduction of a BA degree from the University of Ulster, in 2004. This program ran until 2007, when it was replaced with BSc (Hons) International Hotel and Tourism Management, also validated and awarded by the University of Ulster. HTMi added a Masters level qualification to its portfolio in 2006 with the introduction of the MBA Hospitality, awarded by Queen Margaret University, Edinburgh. This was replaced in 2012 by the Master of Science in International Hospitality and Tourism Management, validated and awarded by Edinburgh Napier University.

Mission
The management development philosophy of the educational institute is captured in the given mission of HTMi: Come as a Student, Become a Manager. This statement provides the basis for an understanding of the holistic approach towards management training and education, whereby students are placed in an environment that matches that which would be found within the hospitality industry, in terms of professional behavior and professional image.

Courses and Programmes
The educational institute offers a number of courses, all taught in English, as follows:

 Certificate in International Hotel and Tourism Operations
 Diploma in International Hotel and Tourism Management
 Higher Diploma in International Hotel and Tourism Management
 Diploma in Training for Trainers in Hotel Management - Specialisation Course
 BSc (Hons) International Hotel and Tourism Management (awarded by University of Ulster)
 Advanced Diploma / PgD in European Baking and Pastry Arts - Specialisation Course
 Postgraduate Diploma in International Hotel and Tourism Management
 Postgraduate Diploma in Events Management
 MA Hotel Business Management and MA Postgraduate Diploma in Hotel Business Management  (Double Award)
 MBA in Hospitality Management and MBA Postgraduate Diploma in Hospitality Management (Double Award)
 Master's Dissertation Course
 Joint Degree: MSc International Hospitality and Tourism Management (awarded by Edinburgh Napier University) & MBA in Hospitality Management and MBA Postgraduate Diploma in Hospitality Management (awarded by HTMi) (Triple Award)
 Executive MBA in Hotel Management, includes Exec. MBA Postgraduate Certificate in Hotel Management, Exec. MBA Postgraduate Diploma in Hotel Management (Triple Award)

Research Conference

The International Hospitality Research Centre Switzerland, based at HTMi, organises the International Hospitality & Tourism Research Conference Switzerland - IHTRCS, twice per year at HTMi in Sörenberg and in Luzern. Papers are presented by students and staff on contemporary issues in hospitality and tourism. Keynote speakers include researchers and authors:
 in 2010: Prof. Joe Goldblatt from the Queen Margaret University and Prof. Tom Baum from the University of Strathclyde
 in 2011: Dr. Noëlle O'Connor from the Limerick Institute of Technology and Prof. John Tribe from the University of Surrey
 in 2012: Mr. Yves P. Givel from the Hyatt Hotels Corporation, Prof. Adele Ladkin from the Bournemouth University and Prof. Mike Osborne from the University of Glasgow
 in 2013: Prof. Rowena Murray from University of the West of Scotland, Mr William J. O'Toole from EMBOK - Event Management Body of Knowledge, Dr Laila Gibson from The Värmland Regional Tourism Board, Prof. Paul Lynch from Edinburgh Napier University, Dr Timothy Jung from Manchester Metropolitan University

Development
As part of its culture, Lead don't Follow, Create don't Copy, HTMi has achieved the following:
 it has become a research and development centre for a new Swiss-based international hotel brand: Swisstouches Hotels & Resorts
 it has an online newspaper for the hospitality industry: Hospitality Times
 it has the Global Campus on iTunes U
 it has developed a technology strategy in education entitled Touch, Teach and Learn and it has adopted the Apple iPod Touch, and recently, the iPad mini for hospitality education and operations management

Recognition
The external quality control of the courses offered at HTMi, is exercised through Swiss, UK and International bodies. For example, in Switzerland this is carried out by the EDUQUA certification. In the UK, The Institute of Hospitality - IOH, formerly known as the HCIMA, requires a quinquennial resubmission of all the Degree and Sub-degree courses. This is subject to a panel-based review by specialists in the field. In addition, the British Accreditation Council also conducts a quinquennial review of the schools provision, via an onsite inspection. HTMi is, however, not accredited within Switzerland.

Sister School
SHML Swiss College of Hospitality Lenk

In 2015, SHML Swiss College of Hospitality Lenk has reached an agreement with HTMi that HTMi will merge SHML within its umbrella organization to operate SHML Lenk.

References

External links
 HTMi International Hospitality Student Journal
 HTMi Contemporary Issues in Hospitality Student Journal
 HTMi Alumni Worldwide
HTMi Education Consultant in Vietnam

Hospitality schools in Switzerland
Hospitality management
Educational institutions established in 1999
Business schools in Switzerland
1990 establishments in the United Kingdom
1999 establishments in Switzerland
Higher education in Switzerland